Elsfjord Church is a parish church of the Church of Norway in Vefsn Municipality in Nordland county, Norway. It is located in the village of Elsfjord. It is the church for the Elsfjord parish which is part of the Indre Helgeland prosti (deanery) in the Diocese of Sør-Hålogaland. The red, wooden church was built in a long church style in 1955 using plans drawn up by the architect Torgeir Alvsaker. The church seats about 200 people.

Media gallery

See also
List of churches in Sør-Hålogaland

References

Vefsn
Churches in Nordland
Wooden churches in Norway
20th-century Church of Norway church buildings
Churches completed in 1955
1955 establishments in Norway
Long churches in Norway